is a Japanese four-panel surreal comedy webcomic and digital manga series written and illustrated by Bkub Okawa (alternatively romanized as "Bukubu Okawa"), which started serialization on Takeshobo's Manga Life Win website in August 2014. Takeshobo has released three volumes in Japan. The manga is licensed in North America by Vertical.

The manga chronicles the misadventures of two 14-year-old girls named Popuko and Pipimi, who encounter a variety of both mundane and bizarre situations and respond to them in equally bizarre and exaggerated ways. The manga is noted for its frequent parodies of pop culture and its combination of surrealism, absurdity, and non-sequitur, all of which have contributed to it developing a cult following among both Japanese and Western audiences. An anime television series adaptation animated by Kamikaze Douga and produced by King Records aired on Tokyo MX and other channels from January 7, 2018 to December 18, 2022 for two seasons. The first season concluded on March 25, 2018, and two special episodes aired on April 1, 2019. The second season was co-produced by Space Neko Company (credited in the English version as Space Cat Company) and premiered on October 2, 2022.

Characters

One of two protagonists. A quick-tempered, short, blondish orange-haired school girl.

Bob Epic Team segments: 
Japon Mignon segments: Fanny Bloc

The second protagonist and Popuko's friend. A slightly less quick-tempered, tall, blue-haired school girl.

Bob Epic Team segments: 
Japon Mignon segments: Christine Bellier (TV series), Kaycie Chase (TV special)

Media

Manga
Pop Team Epic is written and illustrated by Bkub Okawa, previously known for his Touhou Project dōjinshi. The series was serialized in Takeshobo's Manga Life Win website between August 29, 2014 and November 7, 2015. The first tankōbon volume was released in print on December 7, 2015. Okawa released the "second season" on the Manga Life Win website between February 18, 2016 and April 30, 2017. The second volume was released on June 7, 2017. A "third season" began on the Manga Life Win website on October 10, 2017. The manga is licensed in North America by Vertical, who began releasing the series in October 2018. A comic anthology based on the fictional Hoshiiro Girldrop manga featured in the series was released on January 9, 2018.

Anime
An anime adaptation of the series was announced on April 2, 2017. It was initially teased as an adaptation of Hoshiiro Girldrop on April Fool's Day 2017. The anime features animation by Kamikaze Douga (credited in Hoshiiro Girldrop as ) and production by King Records (credited in Hoshiiro Girldrop as ), and is directed by Jun Aoki and Aoi Umeki. The first season aired on BS11, Tokyo MX and other networks for 12 episodes from January 7 to March 25, 2018, following a delay from October 2017 due to an "error by King Records". A television special aired on April 1, 2019 which consists of episodes 13 and 14. 

Taking after its source manga, the anime takes the form of an animated parody show, featuring numerous, typically disjointed skits of varying lengths; while some of these shorts are adapted from the original comic strips, the majority of them are original creations. Each half-hour episode features two near-identical 15-minute segments, each containing different voice actors and other subtle differences.

The opening theme for episodes 2-10 is "Pop Team Epic" (remixed as "Pop Team Epic (Rebroadcasting Mix)" in Pop Team Epic Repeat from the second half of Episode 4 to the first half of Episode 9) by Sumire Uesaka, while the ending theme for the first 9 episodes and episodes 11 and 12 is "Poppy Pappy Day" (remixed in Episode 5 as "Poppy Pappy Day (Route 66 Mix)" and Episode 7 as "Poppy Pappy Day (8 Bit Mix)") is sung by Popuko (Yui Makino/Kenji Akabane (ep 1-6), Hiromi Igarashi/Toshiki Masuda (ep 8–9, 11)) and Pipimi (Yui Watanabe/Shunsuke Takeuchi (ep 1-6), Rei Matsuzaki/Wataru Hatano (ep 8–9, 11)), with Shouta Aoi (playing as himself) performing the theme for the male part of episode 12. The ending theme for episode 10 is  also by the Igarashi/Matsuzaki and Masuda/Hatano duos as Popuko and Pipimi, respectively. The opening theme for Episode 1, which opened with a Hoshiiro Girldrop segment, is the first season's opening theme, "Twinkling Star" by Drop Stars (Sosogu Hoshifuri (Yui Ogura), Shizuku Tsukino (Inori Minase), and Korona Yuhi (Uesaka)). Episode 12 used the classical music pieces Night on Bald Mountain and Dies Irae in its storyline. The opening theme for episode 13 is "last sparkle" by Uesaka, while episode 14 uses the opening theme for the second season of Hoshiiro Girldrop, "Pretty candle star" by Drop Stars (Hiroshifuri (Ogura), Tsukino (Minase), and Yuhi (Uesaka)) in the first half and parodied by Shunsuke Itakura and Tōru Adachi of Team AC (voicing as Yuhi) in the second half. The insert song for episode 14 is "Bansaku neender", sung by the Ozaki/Uchida and Ito/Kijima duos and the Mendez/Tindle and Lee/Seitz duos as Popuko and Pipimi in both Japanese and English, respectively with Aoi (himself) singing his version of the ending theme "Fūsen Hikō" for episode 14a, as well as his own ending theme, "AOI Traveler" for episode 14b.

The series was renewed for a second season on December 26, 2021, following the finale of Pop Team Epic Repeat. Jun Aoki returned as director and scriptwriter, while Space Neko Company (Space Cat Company) is animating the season alongside Kamikaze Douga, and aired from October 2 to December 18, 2022. The opening theme of episodes 15 and 26 is "Endless Love" by Aoi (himself), while the ending theme for the episode 26 is "Shota Aoi Gymnastics" by Aoi (himself).

Sentai Filmworks simulcast the series on Hidive. Crunchyroll simulcast the series worldwide outside of Asia. Funimation simulcast the English-dubbed version in English-speaking territories as it aired; Funimation also acquired the rights to release the anime on home video in North America. Funimation also arranged the series to air on Adult Swim's Toonami programming block starting on July 1, 2018. In Australia and New Zealand, the series simulcast on AnimeLab. Aniplus Asia simulcast the series in Southeast Asia. The series became available on Netflix in February 2020 in what was originally 11-minute episodes. It was replaced by the original half-hour format due to complaints from users. A remixed rerun titled Pop Team Epic Repeat, which mixes up the voice actors from the original run, began airing from October 9, 2021 and is being simulcast by Crunchyroll. It also features re-recorded versions of the Team AC segments and Japanese dubs of the Japon Mignon segments. There are also visual differences in the Repeat version.

Series overview

Season 1 (2018)

Specials (2019)
Both episodes for the main segments are by Space Cat Company.

Season 2 (2022)

Marketing
The Nendoroid figures of Popuko and Pipimi, dressed as Batman Ninja Batman (voiced by Kōichi Yamadera) and Joker (voiced by Wataru Takagi) respectively, were displayed at the Warner Bros. booth at AnimeJapan 2018. It was suggested by Junpei Mizusaki at Kamikaze Douga; the studio animated both Pop Team Epic television series and Batman Ninja film. The crossover figures were accompanied by a 15-second television commercial, where Popuko and Pipimi (in the aforementioned costumes and being voiced by the film's respective voice actors) re-enact a sketch from Pop Team Epic comics before it jumps to a Batman Ninja scene.

On April 26, 2018, Japan Racing Association's Umabi.jp website launched the  campaign, where users can create a customised avatar of either Popuko or Pipimi as a virtual spectator. It also hinted a surprise to be revealed when a number of avatars reaches one million. As the number reached one million in late May 2018, the JRA released a branded webisode on 14 June 2018. Produced by Space Neko Company (which animated Pop Team Story segments and some of short sketches in the TV series), Mikako Komatsu and Ryusei Nakao reprised their role as Popuko in the first and second halves respectively, and so did Sumire Uesaka and Norio Wakamoto as Pipimi. The JRA also held promotional events at Tokyo Racecourse.

Notes

References

External links
  
 

Anime series based on manga
Funimation
Internet memes introduced in 2018
Japanese television series with live action and animation
Japanese webcomics
Manga Life Win manga
Seinen manga
Sentai Filmworks
Surreal comedy anime and manga
Takeshobo manga
Toonami
Vertical (publisher) titles
Webcomics in print
Yonkoma